St.Joseph's College, Moolamattom, is an arts and science college in the Idukki district of the Indian state of Kerala. Established in 1981, it offers undergraduate and postgraduate degrees in Natural Sciences, Economics, English Language, Commerce and Social Work. The college is affiliated with Mahatma Gandhi University.

References

External links 
Education in Idukki district

Catholic universities and colleges in India
Arts and Science colleges in Kerala
Universities and colleges in Idukki district
Educational institutions established in 1980
1980 establishments in Kerala
Colleges affiliated to Mahatma Gandhi University, Kerala